Archduchess Catherine Renata of Austria (4 January 1576 – 29 June 1599) was a member of the House of Habsburg.

She was the daughter of Archduke Charles II of Austria, the son of Emperor Ferdinand I, and Maria Anna of Bavaria. Her elder brother Archduke Ferdinand succeeded Matthias as Holy Roman Emperor in 1619.

Life
Born in Graz and like all of her siblings, Catherine Renata suffered from the famous Habsburg inferior lip. Negotiations for a marriage between her and Ranuccio I Farnese, Duke of Parma ended when Catherine Renata suddenly died aged twenty-three. She was buried in the Seckau Abbey.

Ancestors

References

1576 births
1599 deaths
16th-century House of Habsburg
Austrian princesses
Daughters of monarchs